Caeau Ty'n-llwyni is a Site of Special Scientific Interest in Brecknock, Powys, Wales.

See also
List of Sites of Special Scientific Interest in Brecknock

Sites of Special Scientific Interest in Brecknock